The Republic of India and the Federal Republic of Nigeria have built strategic and commercial ties. Both are members of the Commonwealth of Nations and the Non-Aligned Movement.  India has a High Commission in Abuja and a Consulate in Lagos, and Nigeria has a High Commission in New Delhi. Indian business firms have invested estimated $15 billion in Nigeria. India is Nigeria's leading investor, with a investment base of about $20 billion. The figures on the amount of Nigeria's investment in India if any are not known. India-Africa trade has slowly been increasing with trade volume of USD 55.9 billion in year 2020-2021.

History 
India's relations with Africa date back to 30 BCE when there was trade between Egypt (under Roman Emperor Augustus) and India. Up to 120 Roman ships set sail each year from Myos Hormos (Al-Qusayr) in Roman Egypt to India. In the same period, Indian dhows frequented East African shores selling Indian handloom products, spices and other goods. Archaeological evidence recently found in Egypt shows that Indian merchants that traded with the Mediterranean region were inhabitants of the Coromandel Coast of India. That exhibits the extent of India-Africa relations at that time. 

India gained independence in 1947; Nigeria followed and gained independence in 1960. India strongly supported independence of African countries from colonial rule and established its diplomatic mission in 1958 – two years before Nigeria officially gained independence from British rule. Soon after Nigerian independence, the Indian government got involved in helping establish a military and several other projects in Nigeria. India aided Nigeria in building military establishments like the Nigerian Defence Academy (NDA) at Kaduna and the Naval College at Port Harcourt, along with other military training facilities. Several Nigerian military personnel attended the Defence Services Staff College (DSSC) in Wellington, Tamil Nadu, India. The current President of Nigeria Muhammadu Buhari attended the DSSC in the 1970s. Other Nigerian presidents who attended the same college are Presidents Olusegun Obasanjo (1965) and Ibrahim Babangida (1964). A few other top Nigerian military officers also attended India's Defence Services Staff College. Upon Nigeria gaining independence, Indian businesses set up shops in Nigeria. 

Both nations possess diverse natural and economic resources and are the largest economies in their respective regions. Currently India's concessional line of credit to Africa is almost $9 billion, with present projects taking up $7.4 billion.

Economic relations 
India- Nigeria trade in 2018-19 amounted to US$13.89 billion. Despite the ever present threat of Nigerian 'Boko Haram' terrorists organisation and 'Black Axe mafia' Indian firms are the second biggest employers in Nigeria after the Nigerian Federal Government. More than 135 Indian firms operate in Nigeria. Indian firm in Nigeria are in greatly diverse fields e.g.  pharmaceuticals, engineering goods, electrical machinery and equipment, plastics, chemicals, etc. Some of the major companies include Bharti Airtel, Tata, Bajaj Auto, Birla Group, Kirloskar, Mahindra, Ashok Leyland, Skipper, Godrej, Simba Group, NIIT, Aptech, New India Assurance, Bhushan Steel, KEC, Dabur, etc. Indian investment in Nigeria amounts to US$15 billion and rising according to the Indian High Commission in Abuja. Indian exports to Nigeria during the period 2018-19 were US$3 billion and India's imports from Nigeria during same period 2018-19 were worth US$10.88 billion. Nigeria was the fifth biggest seller of crude oil and third biggest seller of LNG after Qatar and UAE in year 2020 to India.In year 2020-2021 USA stood second after Iraq as the biggest seller of crude oil to India.  Indian exports to Nigeria are Pharmaceuticals, automobiles, cars, iron and steel, rice, plastics, clothes and fabrics, engineering equipment, and power sector components such as transformers, insulators and circuit breaker etc. India is Nigeria's biggest trading partner in Africa, with trade volume of about $16.35 billion in year 2019-2020. India is Nigeria's leading investor, with a investment base of about $20 billion. India-Africa trade has slowly been increasing with trade volume of USD 55.9 billion in year 2020-2021. India is the fifth largest investor in Africa with cumulative investment of USD 54 billion. India is also  the third largest trading partner of Africa after China and USA. India accounts for 6.4% of total African trade. Figures on the type and fields of Nigeria's investments into the  Indian economy are  unknown.

Oil trade
India is the third largest oil consumer after USA and China. India uses 5.5 million barrels of oil per day. India buys crude oil from Saudi Arabia, Iraq, Iran, Kuwait, Kazakhstan  and UAE with significantly  reduced amount from Nigeria in year 2021. In year 2020-2021 USA took second place in India's Oil imports with Iraq topping the list again. Since year 2018 India buys cheaper Basra Oil from Iraq and the crude oil purchased from West Africa including from Nigeria rank fifth in India's crude oil purchases. annually.

References 

 
Bilateral relations of Nigeria
Africa–India relations
Nigeria
Nigeria
India